José Luis Sosa (1 January 1956 – 10 October 2021) was a Uruguayan footballer who played as a goalkeeper. He played in five matches for the Uruguay national football team in 1984. He was also part of Uruguay's squad for the 1983 Copa América tournament.

References

External links
 

1956 births
Living people
Uruguayan footballers
Uruguay international footballers
Place of birth missing (living people)
Association football goalkeepers
Pan American Games gold medalists for Uruguay
Medalists at the 1983 Pan American Games
Footballers at the 1983 Pan American Games
Pan American Games medalists in football